KJBX (106.3 FM) is a radio station broadcasting an adult contemporary format. Licensed to Cash, Arkansas, United States, it serves the Jonesboro area.  The station is currently owned by Saga Communications.

The call letters KJBX were previously assigned to 580 AM Lubbock, Texas.

Programming
KAIT's Region 8 News 6pm newscast is simulcast Monday thru Friday.

KJBX-HD2 (98.5 FM K253BQ Jonesboro)
"98.5 The Outlaw" is a radio station broadcasting a classic country format.

Previous logo
 (KJBX's logo under previous 106.7 frequency)

External links

Mainstream adult contemporary radio stations in the United States
JBX
Radio stations established in 1973
1973 establishments in Arkansas